Stejneger's beaked snake (Letheobia stejnegeri) is a species of snake in the family Typhlopidae. The species is native to Middle Africa.

Etymology
The specific name, stejnegeri, is in honor of Leonhard Stejneger, Norwegian-born American herpetologist at the Smithsonian Institution for over 60 years.

Geographic range
L. stejnegeri is found in the Democratic Republic of the Congo and in the Republic of the Congo.

Habitat
The preferred natural habitat of L. stejnegeri is forest.

Reproduction
L. stejnegeri is oviparous.

References

Further reading
Broadley DG, Wallach V (2007). "A review of East and Central African species of Letheobia Cope, revived from the synonymy of Rhinotyphlops Fitzinger, with descriptions of five new species (Serpentes: Typhlopidae)". Zootaxa 1515: 31–68. (Letheobia stejnegeri, new combination).
Loveridge A (1931). "A new snake of the genus Typhlops from the Belgian Congo". Copeia 1931 (3): 92–93. (Typhlops stejnegeri, new species).

Letheobia
Snakes of Africa
Reptiles of the Democratic Republic of the Congo
Reptiles of the Republic of the Congo
Taxa named by Arthur Loveridge
Reptiles described in 1931